Jetsada Chudech (Thai เจษฎา ชูเดช), is a Thai futsal Forward, and currently a member of Thailand national futsal team.

Royal decoration 
 2015 –  Member (Fifth Class) of The Most Admirable Order of the Direkgunabhorn

References

Jetsada Chudech
1989 births
Living people
Futsal forwards
Jetsada Chudech
Jetsada Chudech
Southeast Asian Games medalists in futsal
Competitors at the 2011 Southeast Asian Games
Competitors at the 2013 Southeast Asian Games
Competitors at the 2017 Southeast Asian Games
Thai expatriate sportspeople in Indonesia
Jetsada Chudech